Serhiy Zhurba (born 14 March 1987), is a Ukrainian futsal player who plays for Lokomotiv Kharkiv and the Ukraine national futsal team.

References

External links 
UEFA profile

1987 births
Living people
Futsal forwards
Ukrainian men's futsal players
MFC Lokomotyv Kharkiv players